Christina McPhee (born 1954, Los Angeles, California) is an American painter,  new media and video artist. She lives on California's central coast and San Francisco, CA.

Art
Christina McPhee works in drawing as a core practice, developing layered works that move from the paper into video and photomontage. Her work is concerned with psychogenerative landscapes and bioassemblage. In media arts, she moves scientific visualization into alternative maps based around site-specific observation. Her drawings involve linear, fugue-like structures that become topologic fields.

Life
McPhee attended Scripps College in Claremont, California and obtained a Bachelor of Fine Arts (BFA) in painting and printmaking at the Kansas City Art Institute in Kansas City, Missouri.  She obtained a Master of Fine Arts degree (MFA) in painting from Boston University College of Fine Arts, where she was a student of Philip Guston.   Solo museum exhibitions include those at the American University Museum located in the Katzen Arts Center in Washington, D.C. in 2007,  the Bildmuseet in Umea, Sweden in 2005, and the Cartes Center for Art and Technology in Espoo, Finland in 2006. She was a participating artist and writer at Documenta 12 in Kassel, Germany in 2007, and at the Bucharest Biennale, a contemporary art festival held every two years in Bucharest, Romania in 2008.  Video and multimedia work shown at international festivals include VIDEOFORMES in Clermont-Ferrand, France in 2009, and Open Space in Cologne, Germany in 2010.

Museum collections
McPhee’s works of art are included in numerous public and private collections around the world, including the Kemper Museum of Contemporary Art in Kansas City, Missouri; the New Museum of Contemporary art/Rhizome ArtBase; the Experimental Television Center in Owego, New York; the Spencer Museum of Art of the University of Kansas in Lawrence, Kansas; the Sheldon Museum of Art at the University of Nebraska in Lincoln, Nebraska; the Taylor Museum for Southwestern Studies and the Colorado Springs Fine Arts Center in Colorado Springs, Colorado; the Thresholds New Media Collection in Perth, Scotland, United Kingdom, among others.

References

External links
Christina McPhee’s home page
Christina McPhee: La Conchita Mon Amour by John Haber (accessed May 26, 2010)
Sharon Lin Tay’s discussion of McPhee’s La Conchita mon amour . (accessed May 26, 2010)
2009 Artist Book by Christina McPhee (accessed May 26, 2010)
Short video clips by Christina McPhee
Home page of Silverman Gallery

1954 births
Living people
Artists from Los Angeles
Artists from the San Francisco Bay Area
American video artists
American multimedia artists
Boston University College of Fine Arts alumni
Scripps College alumni